Lychrosimorphus is a genus of beetle in the family Cerambycidae. Its only species is Lychrosimorphus vittatus. It was described by Pic in 1925.

References

Pteropliini
Beetles described in 1925